Siliva Siliva (born 11 February 1991) is an Australian rugby union player who plays for the Brumbies in Super Rugby. His playing position is hooker. He was previously a member of the Western Force squad for the 2011 Super Rugby season although he did not make any first-team appearances. He made his Super Rugby debut for the Brumbies against the Reds in 2013.

Siliva represented Australia under 20 at the 2011 IRB Junior World Championship.

His cousin Aaron Edwards has played AFL with West Coast Eagles, North Melbourne and Richmond; his second cousin Maria Tutaia played netball for the New Zealand Silver Ferns and another second cousin, Keith Peters, played rugby league for Penrith Panthers and Papua New Guinea.

Super Rugby statistics

References

External links
Rugby Australia Profile
Brumbies profile

1991 births
Australian rugby union players
Australian sportspeople of Samoan descent
ACT Brumbies players
Rugby union hookers
Sportsmen from Victoria (Australia)
Living people
Greater Sydney Rams players
Canberra Vikings players
Melbourne Rebels players
Melbourne Rising players
Rugby union players from Melbourne